American Samoa is administratively divided into three districts (Western, Eastern and Manu‘a) and two unorganized atolls (Swains Island and Rose Atoll). The districts are subdivided into 15 counties, which are composed of 76 villages.

For statistical purposes, the United States Census Bureau counts the three districts and two unorganized atolls as five county equivalents, while treating the actual counties as minor civil divisions.

American Samoa has only one U.S. zip code: 96799.

Divisions

Maps

Statistics
The populations below are from the 2020 census, and the areas are from the 2010 census.

Local government structure

Amata Coleman Radewagen's congressional website said the following about American Samoa's districts:

The U.S. National Park Service says the following about the structure of villages in American Samoa:

Notes

References

Subdivisions of American Samoa
Villages in American Samoa
Administrative divisions in Oceania
American Samoa-related lists
American Samoa